William James Maitland  (22 July 1847 – 8 May 1919) was a British civil servant in India and a Scottish first-class cricketer.

The son of Augustus Maitland and his wife, Elizabeth Jane Richards, he was born at Edinburgh in July 1847. He was educated in Edinburgh at the Edinburgh Academy. He made his debut in first-class cricket for the Marylebone Cricket Club (MCC) against Cambridge University at Lord's in 1868, scoring a half century with 57 on debut. He made two further appearances in first-class cricket in 1869, playing for the Gentlemen of England against Oxford University at Oxford, and for the MCC against Surrey at The Oval. He married Agnes Magdalene Neville-Grenville in August 1878, with the couple having two children. Maitland later moved to British India, where he served as the private secretary for the Secretary of State for India. He was made a Companion to the Order of the Indian Empire in February 1887. He later served as the deputy government director of the Indian Railways from 1892–1912. He died in a nursing home at Westminster in May 1919.

References

External links

1847 births
1919 deaths
Cricketers from Edinburgh
People educated at Edinburgh Academy
Scottish cricketers
Marylebone Cricket Club cricketers
Gentlemen of England cricketers
Indian Civil Service (British India) officers
Companions of the Order of the Indian Empire